Jar (also Romanized as Jār; also known as Jiyār and Jor) is a village in Keraj Rural District, in the Central District of Isfahan County, Isfahan Province, Iran. At the 2012 census, its population was 770, in 187 families.

References 

Populated places in Isfahan County